The 4th Anti-aircraft Artillery Regiment "Peschiera" is an anti-aircraft artillery regiment of the Italian Army. Today the regiment is based in Mantua in Lombardy and administratively assigned to the Anti-aircraft Artillery Command.

Current Structure
As of 2022 the 4th Anti-aircraft Artillery Regiment "Peschiera" consists of:

  Regimental Command, in Mantua
 Command and Logistic Support Battery
 Signal Company
 Anti-aircraft Group
 1st SAMP/T Battery
 2nd SAMP/T Battery
 3rd SAMP/T Battery
 4th SAMP/T Battery
 5th SAMP/T (Training) Battery
 Fire Control and Support Battery

The Command and Logistic Support Battery fields the following sections: C3 Section, Transport and Materiel Section, Medical Section, and Commissariat Section. The regiment is equipped with SAMP/T surface-to-air missile systems.

External links
Italian Army Website: 4° Reggimento Artiglieria Controaerei "Peschiera"

References

Artillery Regiments of Italy